The 2011–12 Football League (known as the npower Football League for sponsorship reasons) was the 113th season of the Football League. It began in August 2011 and concluded in May 2012, with the promotion play-off finals.
The Football League is contested through three Divisions. The divisions are the Championship, League One and League Two. The winner and the runner up of the League Championship are automatically promoted to the Premier League and they are joined by the winner of the Championship playoff. The bottom two teams in League Two are relegated to the Conference Premier.

Promotion and relegation

From Premier League
 Relegated to Championship
 Birmingham City
 Blackpool
 West Ham United

From Championship
 Promoted to Premier League
 Queens Park Rangers
 Norwich City
 Swansea City

 Relegated to League One
 Preston North End
 Sheffield United
 Scunthorpe United

From League One
 Promoted to Championship
 Brighton & Hove Albion
 Southampton
 Peterborough United

 Relegated to League Two
 Dagenham & Redbridge
 Bristol Rovers
 Plymouth Argyle
 Swindon Town

From League Two
 Promoted to League One
 Chesterfield
 Bury
 Wycombe Wanderers
 Stevenage

 Relegated to Conference Premier
 Lincoln City
 Stockport County

From Conference Premier
 Promoted to League Two
 Crawley Town
 AFC Wimbledon

Championship

Table

Play-offs

Results

League One

Table

Play-offs

Results

League Two

Table

Play-offs

Results

Managerial changes

Notes

References

External links
Football League website
BBC Sport

 
2011-12
2011–12 in English football leagues